Icebird may refer to:

Icebird (ship), an icebreaker ship chartered for many years by the Australian Government for research expeditions to Antarctica
Icebird (band), an American indie rock band
Icebird, a character in the Transformers Beast Wars series
"Icebird", a music collaboration of singer Aaron Livingston and producer RJD2
"Ice Bird", a character in Angry Birds Space